Malta competed at the 2018 Mediterranean Games in Tarragona, Spain from 22 June to 1 July 2018.

Medal summary

Medal table

Athletics 

Men
Track & road events

Women
Track & road events

Boules 

Men

Golf

Shooting 

Men

Women

Weightlifting 

Women

Wrestling

Men's Freestyle

References

Nations at the 2018 Mediterranean Games
2018
Mediterranean Games